Karjamaa (Estonian for "Pasture", literally "Grazing Land") is a subdistrict in the district of Põhja-Tallinn, Tallinn, the capital of Estonia. It's located northwest of Kalamaja and east of Sitsi, main part is between Kopli, Tööstuse and Erika streets. Karjamaa also includes the Hundipea area and the Mine Harbour (Miinisadam) by the Tallinn Bay. Karjamaa has a population of 5,314.

The name "Karjamaa" meaning pasture, was carried over to the neighbourhood because the area was mostly used as a pasture before the 19th century. The first known settlement in the Hundipea area is mentioned in 1374 as Zudenpeyke (Susipea). Karjamaa is also known as Sitsimägi (Chintz Hill). In 1728 a large stone building, which housed the navy hospital for a short time, was built in the area. The settlement was also influenced by the establishment of Kopli cemetery (in Kopli), a new road passed through Karjamaa. Directly before the World War I the Mine Harbour and war factory "Arsenal" were built in Karjamaa. The Arsenal submachine gun is probably their most famous product.

Gallery

References

External links

Subdistricts of Tallinn